Philip Harland is a former track cyclist from New Zealand. He won the bronze medal in the men's tandem sprint at the 1974 British Commonwealth Games partnering Paul Medhurst.

References

Living people
New Zealand male cyclists
Cyclists at the 1974 British Commonwealth Games
Commonwealth Games bronze medallists for New Zealand
Place of birth missing (living people)
Commonwealth Games medallists in cycling
Year of birth missing (living people)
20th-century New Zealand people
Medallists at the 1974 British Commonwealth Games